A powiat (pronounced ; Polish plural: powiaty) is the second-level unit of local government and administration in Poland, equivalent to a county, district or prefecture (LAU-1, formerly NUTS-4) in other countries. The term "powiat" is most often translated into English as "county" or "district" (sometimes "poviat"). In historical contexts this may be confusing because  the Polish term hrabstwo (an administrative unit administered/owned by a hrabia (count) is also literally translated as "county".

A powiat is part of a larger unit, the voivodeship (Polish województwo) or province.

A powiat is usually subdivided into gminas (in English, often referred to as "communes" or "municipalities").  Major towns and cities, however, function as separate counties in their own right, without subdivision into gminas. They are termed "city counties" (powiaty grodzkie or, more formally, miasta na prawach powiatu) and have roughly the same status as former county boroughs in the UK.  The other type of powiats are termed "land counties" (powiaty ziemskie).

As of 2018, there were 380 powiat-level entities: 314 land counties, and 66 city counties. For a complete alphabetical listing, see "List of Polish counties". For tables of counties by voivodeship, see the articles on the individual voivodeships (e.g., Greater Poland Voivodeship).

History
The history of Polish powiats goes back to the second half of the 14th century. They remained the basic unit of territorial organization in Poland, then in the Polish–Lithuanian Commonwealth, until the latter's partitioning in 1795.

In the 19th century, the powiats continued to function in the part of Poland that had been incorporated into the Russian Empire ("Congress Poland")—the equivalent of the Russian uyezd–and, in the German-governed Grand Duchy of Poznań, as the Polish equivalent of the German Kreis.

After Poland regained independence in 1918, the powiats were again the second-level territorial units.

Powiats were abolished in 1975 in favour of a larger number of voivodeships, but were reintroduced on 1 January 1999. This reform also created 16 larger voivodeships.

Functioning
Legislative power within a powiat is vested in an elected council (rada powiatu), while local executive power is vested in an executive board (zarząd powiatu) headed by the starosta, elected by the council. The administrative offices headed by the starosta are called the starostwo. However, in city counties these institutions do not exist separatelytheir powers and functions are exercised by the city council (rada miasta), the directly elected mayor (burmistrz or prezydent), and the city office/town hall (urząd miasta).

In some cases a powiat has its seat outside its own territory. For example, Poznań County (powiat poznański) has its offices in Poznań, although Poznań is itself a city county, and is therefore not part of Poznań County.

Powiats have relatively limited powers, since many local and regional matters are dealt with either at gmina or voivodeship level. Some of the main areas in which the powiat authorities have decision-making powers and competences include:

 education at high-school level (primary and middle schools are run by the gminas)
 healthcare (at county level)
 public transport
 maintenance of certain designated roads
 land surveying
 issuing of work permits to foreigners
 vehicle registration (see Polish car number plates).

Names and English equivalents 
The Polish the name of a county, in the administrative sense, consists of the word powiat followed by a masculine-gender adjective (because powiat is a masculine noun). In most cases, this is the adjective formed from the name of the town or city where the county has its seat. Thus the county with its seat at the town of Kutno is named powiat kutnowski (Kutno County). (In modern Polish both parts of the name are written in lower case; however, names of powiats in the Grand Duchy of Poznań were written in upper case.) If the name of the seat comprises a noun followed by an adjective, as in Maków Mazowiecki ("Mazovian Maków"), the adjective will generally be formed from the noun only (powiat makowski). There are also a few counties whose names are derived from the names of two towns (such as powiat czarnkowsko-trzcianecki, Czarnków-Trzcianka County), from the name of a city and a geographical adjective (powiat łódzki wschodni, Łódź East County), or a mountain range (powiat tatrzański, Tatra County).

There is more than one way to render such names into English. A common method is to translate the names as "(something County)", as in the examples above. (This system is the standard used in Wikipedia.) Thus in most cases the English name for a powiat consists of the name of the city or town which is its seat, followed by the word County.

Note that different counties sometimes have the same name in Polish, since the names of different towns may have the same derived adjective. For example, the counties with their seats at Grodzisk Wielkopolski and Grodzisk Mazowiecki are both called powiat grodziski, and those with seats at Brzeg and Brzesko are both called powiat brzeski. In English this ambiguity either does not occur (Brzeg County and Brzesko County) or can be avoided by using the complete name of the seat (Grodzisk Wielkopolski County and Grodzisk Mazowiecki County).

Sources

 Bankauskaite, V. et al. (2007), Patterns of decentralization across European health systems, in R.B. Saltman, V. Bankauskaite and K. Vrangbæk (ed.), "Decentralization in health care", London: Open University Press/McGraw-Hill.

See also 

 Povit, equivalent in Ukraine

External links
 County. Encyclopedia of Ukraine.

 
Types of administrative division
Former subdivisions of Lithuania
Former subdivisions of Ukraine
Former subdivisions of Belarus
Subdivisions of Poland